Ji Xinjie (born 27 October 1997) is a Chinese swimmer. He competed in the men's 200 metre freestyle and 1500 metre freestyle at the 2018 Asian Games, winning bronze medals for both events.

Personal bests

Long course (50-meter pool)

Short course (25-meter pool)

References

External links
 

1997 births
Living people
Chinese male freestyle swimmers
Sportspeople from Yantai
Asian Games medalists in swimming
Asian Games silver medalists for China
Asian Games bronze medalists for China
Swimmers at the 2018 Asian Games
Medalists at the 2018 Asian Games
Olympic swimmers of China
Swimmers at the 2020 Summer Olympics
21st-century Chinese people